H21 is an important Ukraine national highway (H-highway) in the Donetsk Oblast and Luhansk Oblast of Donbas, Ukraine. It connects Donetsk through Luhansk with Starobilsk.  The highway runs both, west–east between Donetsk and Luhansk, and south–north between Luhansk and Starobilsk.  It passes either through or near Makiivka, Kolosnykove, Khartsyzk, Zuhres; Serdyte, Molodetske, and Shakhtarsk in Shakhtarsky; Torez, Snizhne, Miusynsk, Krasnyi Luch; Ivanivka and Malomykolaivka in Antratsitivsky; Myrne, Uspenka, Lutuhyne, and Heorhiivka in Lutuhynsky; Luhansk; Metalisk, Stukalova Balka, and Lyman-Tsvitni Pisky-Svitle in Slovianoserbsky; Shchastia; Mykhailivka in Troitsky; Novoaidar, Denezhnykove, and Peremorzhne-Shtormove in Novoaidarsky; Shul'hynka in Markivsky, Baidivke, and Polovynkyne in Starobilsky.

War in Donbas
Significant armed conflict has occurred along and near the H21 during the Russo-Ukrainian War.

Main route

Main route and connections to/intersections with other highways in Ukraine.

See also

 Roads in Ukraine
 Ukraine Highways

References

External links
National Roads in Ukraine in Russian

Roads in Donetsk Oblast
Roads in Luhansk Oblast